Sanxingqiao railway station, previously known as South Hsinchu railway station, is a railway station located in Xiangshan District, Hsinchu City, Taiwan. It is located on the West Coast line and is operated by Taiwan Railways.

See also
 List of railway and metro stations in Taiwan

References

2016 establishments in Taiwan
Railway stations opened in 2016
Railway stations in Hsinchu
Railway stations served by Taiwan Railways Administration